Charles Stone (1866 or 1869 – 9 January 1903) was a New Zealand cricketer. He played two first-class matches for Auckland between 1894 and 1896.

See also
 List of Auckland representative cricketers

References

External links
 

1860s births
1903 deaths
New Zealand cricketers
Auckland cricketers
Sportspeople from Ballarat